C29 is a secondary route in Namibia that runs from the south, at the B6 junction approximately 65 miles east of Windhoek. The C29 then terminates to the north at the C22 junction near Otjinene.

References 

Roads in Namibia